The table of specific heat capacities gives the volumetric heat capacity as well as the specific heat capacity of some substances and engineering materials, and (when applicable) the molar heat capacity.

Generally, the most notable constant parameter is the volumetric heat capacity (at least for solids) which is around the value of 3 megajoule per cubic meter per kelvin:

Note that the especially high molar values, as for paraffin, gasoline, water and ammonia, result from calculating specific heats in terms of moles of molecules. If specific heat is expressed per mole of atoms for these substances, none of the constant-volume values exceed, to any large extent, the theoretical Dulong–Petit limit of 25 J⋅mol−1⋅K−1 = 3 R per mole of atoms (see the last column of this table).  For example, Paraffin has very large molecules and thus a high heat capacity per mole, but as a substance it does not have remarkable heat capacity in terms of volume, mass, or atom-mol (which is just 1.41 R per mole of atoms, or less than half of most solids, in terms of heat capacity per atom). Dulong–Petit limit also explains why dense substance which have very heavy atoms, such like lead, rank very low in mass heat capacity.

In the last column, major departures of solids at standard temperatures from the Dulong–Petit law value of 3 R, are usually due to low atomic weight plus high bond strength (as in diamond) causing some vibration modes to have too much energy to be available to store thermal energy at the measured temperature. For gases, departure from 3 R per mole of atoms is generally due to two factors: (1) failure of the higher quantum-energy-spaced vibration modes in gas molecules to be excited at room temperature, and (2) loss of potential energy degree of freedom for small gas molecules, simply because most of their atoms are not bonded maximally in space to other atoms, as happens in many solids.

A Assuming an altitude of 194 metres above mean sea level (the worldwide median altitude of human habitation), an indoor temperature of 23 °C, a dewpoint of 9 °C  (40.85% relative humidity), and 760 mmHg sea level–corrected barometric pressure (molar water vapor content = 1.16%).

B Calculated values
 *Derived data by calculation. This is for water-rich tissues such as brain. The whole-body average figure for mammals is approximately 2.9 J⋅cm−3⋅K−1

Mass heats capacity of building materials 

(Usually of interest to builders and solar )

See also
 List of thermal conductivities

References

Heat conduction